The Tribunale speciale per la difesa dello Stato was a special department of the Fascist Italian government, used to judge crimes against the regime.

Bibliography

Italian Fascism
Government agencies established in 1926
Government agencies disestablished in 1943